Gordon Forbes (August 4, 1920 – June 9, 2003) was an American lawyer and politician.

Forbes was born in Marshall, Lyon County, Minnesota and graduated from Marshall High School. He served in the United States Army during World War II. Forbes graduated from University of Minnesota in 1942 and from University of Minnesota Law School in 1949. He lived in Worthington, Nobles County, Minnesota with his wife and family and practiced law in Worthington, Minnesota. Forbes served in the Minnesota House of Representatives from 1951 to 1954. Forbes was a lobbyist for the railroads business. He died in Little Canada, Minnesota.

References

1920 births
2003 deaths
People from Marshall, Minnesota
People from Worthington, Minnesota
Military personnel from Minnesota
Minnesota lawyers
University of Minnesota alumni
University of Minnesota Law School alumni
Members of the Minnesota House of Representatives